The Teacher (French: Les Grands Esprits) is a 2017 French film written and directed by Olivier Ayache-Vidal, and starring Denis Podalydès.

Synopsis 
One day, when he declares that only an experienced teacher should be sent to schools in disadvantaged neighborhoods, François Foucault, himself a teacher in letters in the prestigious Henri IV French high school, is overheard by a representative of the Ministry of Education. He is then compelled to leave his posh school in Paris and go to the  suburbs, in the “Barbara” High School of Stains, an institution with a bad reputation.

Cast 
 Denis Podalydès : François Foucault
 Abdoulaye Diallo : Seydou
 Tabono Tandia : Maya 
 Pauline Huruguen : Chloé, François' colleague
 Alexis Moncorgé : Gaspard, Chloé's partner
 Charles Templon : Sébastien 
 Léa Drucker : Caroline, François' sister
 Zineb Triki : Agathe
 Mona Magdy Fahim : Rim 
 Emmanuel Barrouyer : the school principal
 François Petit-Perrin : Rémi
 Jean-Pierre Lorit : the Ministry of Education Official
 Marie-Julie Baup : the doctor at the Hospital
 Cheick Sylla : Marvin
 Marie Rémond : Camille 
 Laurent Claret : Pierre Foucault 
 Émilie Gavois-Kahn : The maid

About the film 
 Denis Podalydès, who stars as a teacher in this film, also worked in the education sector for the movie Le Temps des porte-plumes by Daniel Duval (2006), where he was an elementary school teacher.

Soundtrack  
The film's original soundtrack: 
 Glad I Waited - Polly Gibbons / Donald Black & Alexander Rudd
 Who Knows - Marion Black
 Peer Gynt - Edvard Grieg
 Perhaps, Perhaps, Perhaps - Doris Day / Osvaldo Farres
 The Mole Man - Schwab
 VB Drop - Ronald Fritz & JOAT
 Digital Sunset Funk - Gary Royant
 Uptown Girl - David Lynch
 Bump Bump - Charles Kendall Gillette
 100 days, 100 Nights - Sharon Jones & The Dap-Kings
 Hipster Shakes – Black Pistol Fire
 Si maman si - France Gall / Michel Berger
 Those Were The Days - Mary Hopkin

Related Article 
 The Class

References

External links 
 

2017 films